JSC Mozyr Oil Refinery (also Mazyr Oil Refinery;) is one of the 2 oil refineries in the Republic of Belarus (with the other one situated in the city of Novopolotsk). The refinery is located in the city of Mazyr. As of May 2022, Mozyr Oil Refinery is processing 13,700 tonnes of oil per day.

See also
 Naftan Oil Refinery

References

External links
Official web site

Oil refineries in Belarus
Oil and gas companies of Belarus
Oil refineries in the Soviet Union